A list of films produced by the film industry of Assam based in Guwahati, India and publicly released in the decade of 2000s (from year 2000 to 2009).

2000

2001

2002

2003

2004

2005

References

Assamese
2000s
Assamese